Christamore House is a historic settlement house associated with Butler University and located at Indianapolis, Marion County, Indiana.  It was built between 1924 and 1926, and is -story, "U"-shaped, Georgian Revival style brick mansion.  It consists of a two-story, five bay, central section flanked by one-story wings.  It has a slate hipped roof and is nine bays wide, with a three bay central pavilion.  The building features large round-arched windows and contains an auditorium and a gymnasium.

It was added to the National Register of Historic Places in 1985.

References

Residential buildings on the National Register of Historic Places in Indiana
Georgian Revival architecture in Indiana
Houses completed in 1926
Buildings and structures in Indianapolis
National Register of Historic Places in Indianapolis
1926 establishments in Indiana